Bismuth pentoxide is a chemical compound containing bismuth and oxygen. It is a dark red powder decomposing above 20 °C. It has the chemical formula Bi2O5. It is not known as a pure substance, but is usually mixed with water, bismuth tetroxide or bismuth trioxide.

References

Bismuth compounds
Oxides